Gord Titcomb (born September 3, 1953) is a Canadian former professional ice hockey player who played in the World Hockey Association (WHA).

Career 
Drafted in the fifth round of the 1973 NHL Amateur Draft by the Toronto Maple Leafs, Titcomb opted to play in the WHA after being selected by the Toronto Toros in the seventh round of the 1973 WHA Amateur Draft. He played two games for the Toros during the 1974–75 WHA season.

References

External links

1953 births
Canadian ice hockey left wingers
Charlotte Checkers (SHL) players
Ice hockey people from New Brunswick
Jacksonville Barons players
Living people
Mohawk Valley Comets (NAHL) players
People from Restigouche County, New Brunswick
St. Catharines Black Hawks players
Toronto Maple Leafs draft picks
Toronto Toros draft picks
Toronto Toros players
Tucson Mavericks players